Md Mozammel Haque Khan is the former Senior Secretary and currently the Commissioner of Anti-Corruption Commission with the rank of a judge of the High Court Division. He is the Chief National Commissioner of Bangladesh Scouts and President of Bangladesh Karate Federation.

Early life 
Khan was born on 3 November 1959 in Panchkhola Union, Madaripur District, East Pakistan, Pakistan. In 1974 and 1976, Khan graduated from United Islamia Government High School and Dhaka College. He completed his bachelor's degree and masters from University of Dhaka in social sciences. He completed his Doctor of Science from Cairo Demographic Center. He completed his Ph.D. in Public Administration.

Career 
Khan joined Bangladesh Civil Service in 1982 as an administration cadre. In 2001, Khan was a director at the Prime Minister's Office. He was the Deputy Commissioner and District Magistrate of Jhenaidah District. Khan served as personal secretary to President Iajuddin Ahmed in 2007. In 2008, Khan was the Additional Secretary at the Ministry of Education.

In 2009, Khan was promoted to Secretary of Ministry of Chittagong Hill Tracts Affairs. He went on to work at the Ministry of Communication, Implementation Monitoring and Evaluation Division, Planning Ministry, and Energy and Mineral Resources Division. He was also the Secretary of the Roads and Railway Division. In 2014, Khan was promoted to Senior Secretary at the Ministry of Home Affairs. He is a former director of Bangladesh Securities and Exchange Commission. In 2016, Khan was appointed Senior Secretary at the Ministry of Public Administration. He replaced Kamal Abdul Naser Chowdhury.

Khan was made a commissioner of Anti-Corruption Commission in July 2018 replacing Dr. Nasir Uddin Ahmed.

References 

Living people
Bangladeshi civil servants
1959 births
People from Madaripur District
Dhaka College alumni